Red: The Dark Side is a 2007 Indian romantic thriller film directed by Vikram Bhatt. It stars Aftab Shivdasani, Celina Jaitly, Amrita Arora and Sushant Singh in the pivotal roles.

Plot
Neil Oberoi, is a lonely billionaire with a serious heart condition and is in need of a heart transplant. He finds a donor who has left behind the beautiful widow Anahita Saxena. Anahita tells him that her husband Anuj Saxena (the donor) had an affair with her friend Ria, but when he changed his mind and decided to get back to Anahita, Ria couldn't bear it and threatened him to kill both of them. And that Ria is responsible for his death and she's vulnerable because Ria's friend Rocky harasses her. Ria enters the house. Anahita tries to kill Ria, but Neil stops her. In this dilemma, Neil passionately kisses her. He leaves with guilt. They meet again, and Anahita slaps him. But they both admit their lust for each other and end up having sex for hours. One night, Neil murders Rocky in order to protect his lady. Neil rapes Anahita, However it turns consensual. After the incident, ACP Abhay Rastogi finds a watch belonging to Neil and starts suspecting him. Neil and Anahita tries their best to save themselves from police.

Meanwhile, Neil tries to kill Ria, but then it is revealed that Anahita is the real culprit who killed her husband because he wanted to leave her and marry Ria. Anahita couldn't bear it and she plotted to kill her husband through Rocky and made it look like an accident. After learning that Anahita had been betraying him for his manliness and lust and used him for sex, Neil gets heartbroken and baffled. He tells Anahita that he has poisoned her drink. She goes mad at him and runs away from the house in fear. While driving on the road, she meets an accident and dies.

Neil explains everything to the police and he is all free. At last, Neil reveals to Ria that he had never poisoned Anahita's drink. It was her fear which killed her.

Cast
Aftab Shivdasani as Neil Oberoi
Celina Jaitly as Anahita Saxena
Amrita Arora as Ria Malhotra
Sushant Singh as ACP Abhay Rastogi
Amin Hajee as Rocky

Soundtrack

Reception
IndiaGlitz called film's plot "basic". The film was awarded 1 out of 5 by Taran Adarsh of Bollywood Hungama, who criticized the writing, among other things, calling it "outright tacky".

References

External links

Indian neo-noir films
2000s romantic thriller films
2000s Hindi-language films
Films directed by Vikram Bhatt
Indian romantic thriller films
Films scored by Himesh Reshammiya